Natalya Strunnikova (Наталья Струнникова, born March 14, 1964) is a bronze medalist in the 1980 Summer Olympics in the women's 4 x 100 meter medley relay. She was born in Sverdlovsk, Russia.

References

External links
 

1964 births
Living people
Olympic swimmers of the Soviet Union
Olympic bronze medalists for the Soviet Union
Olympic bronze medalists in swimming
Swimmers at the 1980 Summer Olympics
European Aquatics Championships medalists in swimming
Medalists at the 1980 Summer Olympics
Soviet female swimmers